Electric Nebraska is the name commonly given to the E Street Band recordings of the tracks that would eventually comprise the Nebraska album and to some extent the Born in the U.S.A. album, as well as a few compilation albums. The original intent with the album was to record and release the tracks in a traditional rock arrangement with the E Street Band, however, due to the personal, somber, and folksy nature of the demos Springsteen had already recorded and felt the band could not recreate, decided to scrap the full band album and release the tracks as they were, without the rock arrangements. Besides the future Nebraska tracks, the sessions also spawned eight tracks that would eventually find their way to the follow up album Born in the U.S.A. as well as a few released tracks not included on that album and a few that were left unreleased.

History

Bruce Springsteen recorded the demos for the album on a 4-track cassette recorder at his home in a time frame of 1981-1982. Unlike the later Electric Nebraska recordings, the demos were sparse, using only acoustic guitar, electric guitar (on "Open All Night"), harmonica, mandolin, glockenspiel, tambourine, organ, synthesizer (on "My Father's House") and Springsteen's voice. The songs also have sparse composition, and many are simple three-chord songs.

Following the completion of the demos, Springsteen brought the demos down to the studio with the intention of turning them into proper E Street Band recordings, commonly referred to as Electric Nebraska to differentiate them from the demos, however, Springsteen and Jon Landau felt the E Street Band recordings could not duplicate the raw, deeply personal, and haunting folk essence of the home tapes. While the Electric Nebraska album was scrapped, a handful of tracks (namely eight) would later find their way to the Born in the U.S.A. album, released in 1984, a few as stand-alone singles, and a few remaining unreleased in any form to this day. Tracks from these sessions that were included on Born in the U.S.A. include: "Born in the U.S.A.", which was completed on May 3, 1982; "Downbound Train", recorded April 28, 1982; "Cover Me", recorded at the Hit Factory, New York on January 25, 1982; "I'm on Fire", recorded at the Power Station on May 11, 1982; "Glory Days", recorded at the Power Station on May 5, 1982; "Darlington County", recorded at the Power Station on May 13, 1982; "Working on the Highway", recorded April 30 and May 6, 1982, and "I'm Going Down", recorded on May 12 or 13, 1982.

January 3, 1982 is commonly called the "legendary night" where 15 tracks were recorded. These were: "Starkweather" ("Nebraska"), "Atlantic City", "Mansion on the Hill", "Johnny 99", "Highway Patrolman", "State Trooper", "Used Cars", "Wanda" ("Open All Night"), "Reason to Believe", "Born in the U.S.A.", "Downbound Train", "Child Bride", "Losin' Kind", "My Father's House" (May 25, 1982), and "Pink Cadillac", a total of 15 songs; 10 of these tracks would make the Nebraska album while the "Born in the U.S.A." demo would later appear on the Tracks compilation album. The remaining four demos have circulated amongst Springsteen fans with two of these, "Downbound Train" (Born in the U.S.A.) and "Pink Cadillac" (Tracks) being officially released in a band format leaving "Child Bride" and "Losin' Kind" as unreleased outside of their demo versions. There was also another demo, "The Big Payback" recorded later in spring 1982, and "Johnny Bye-Bye", which Springsteen confused with a live version recorded July 1981, that was actually never recorded during this period, that brings the total to the often-cited 17.

Release
Due to the realization that the folk recordings of Nebraska worked better than the band recordings, Electric Nebraska (and its briefly floated double-album plan featuring both the folk and electric recordings) was shelved. Springsteen fans have speculated on whether the album would eventually be released, however, most of the tracks, save for nine that remain unreleased, have been released either on the Nebraska album, Born in the U.S.A. album, or as a stand-alone single or part of a compilation album. In a 2006 interview Jon Landau said that Electric Nebraskas release was unlikely stating that "the right version of Nebraska came out", however, drummer Max Weinberg praised the band recordings as "killing".

Personnel
The following are purported to have taken part in the Electric Nebraska sessions, although it is debatable who may or may not have appeared on these sessions besides Bruce Springsteen:

Bruce Springsteen

The E Street Band

Roy Bittan
Clarence Clemons
Danny Federici
Garry Tallent
Steven Van Zandt
Max Weinberg

Legacy
New Jersey poet Tohm Bakelas released a chapbook of poems titled "Electric Nebraska" that was published in May 2022 by ClairObscur Zine.

References

Bruce Springsteen albums
Columbia Records albums
Unreleased albums